Mazesoba, also known as abura soba (油そば), monjasoba (もんじゃそば), tenukisoba (手抜きそば), abu ramen (あぶラーメン) or shirunashi ramen (汁なしラーメン), is a dry noodle dish made with a sauce of soy sauce and pork lard. Traditional ingredients include shoyu tare base, aroma oil, menma, shredded nori, and green onions. Other variations also include toppings like raw garlic, raw egg, cheese, and minced meat, which are mixed with the noodles before eating.

Mazesoba was introduced in the 1950s with Chin Chin Tei opening up in Musashino City in the 1950s. The largest mazesoba chain in the world is Kokoro Mazesoba.

References

See also
Japanese cuisine

Japanese noodle dishes
Japanese cuisine terms
Japanese inventions